Myrtle Beach International Airport  is a county-owned public-use airport located three nautical miles (6 km) southwest of the central business district of Myrtle Beach, in Horry County, South Carolina, United States. It was formerly known as Myrtle Beach Jetport (1974–1989) and is located on site of the former Myrtle Beach Air Force Base, which also includes The Market Common shopping complex.

The Federal Aviation Administration (FAA) National Plan of Integrated Airport Systems for 2017–2021 categorized it as a small-hub primary commercial service facility. Myrtle Beach has the second-busiest airport in South Carolina behind Charleston, with over 2.4 million passengers (arriving and departing) in 2018.

The airport's official website since 2006 is flymyrtlebeach.com, which was previously an unofficial website owned by an airport employee. In July 2012 the airport launched a redesigned website with a new logo.

History
An airport was started on property from a former army base which the federal government transferred in 1948 through the Surplus Property Act. The city of Myrtle Beach decided not to use the property for an airport but funds from the property still had to be used for an airport. From 1958 to 1976 these funds went to Horry County Jetport in Crescent Beach, which moved to the northeast part of the base after an agreement for joint civilian and military use of the base. In 1977, the City of Myrtle Beach annexed the area of Myrtle Beach Airport. Until 1993, both MYR and Myrtle Beach AFB jointly used the main runway; this limited civil operations to 30 landings per day and led to a local business movement to build an entirely new airport.

In the 1980s, the airport was served by Piedmont Airlines mainline aircraft (later acquired by USAir) and by Delta and Eastern commuter aircraft.

In 1993, the Air Force closed the base as a result of BRAC 1991. The runway and other portions of the former military flight line were then turned over to the Horry County Department of Airports.

American Eagle became a major carrier at MYR in the early 1990s, operating multiple daily ATR 72 flights to the American Airlines hub at Raleigh–Durham International Airport. By late 1994 this route accounted for as much as 12% of the airport's passenger traffic; however, American abruptly ended its American Eagle hub at Raleigh–Durham in December 1994, cancelling all service to MYR and other secondary airports in the region. American returned to Myrtle Beach in 2010 with a seasonal service to Dallas/Fort Worth International Airport.

On April 1, 1996, Myrtle Beach Airport became an international airport. A new international terminal had its grand opening August 21 of that year, and a new logo was unveiled "to reflect the architectural design of the airport's terminal and the influence of the beach by showing a pained window and a palm tree in blues and greens".

The airport served as the main hub for Hooters Air from 2003 until 2006. The airport authority offered discounted hangar space and other undisclosed benefits to Hooters Air operator Pace Airlines in an effort to relocate its operating base from Smith Reynolds Airport in Winston-Salem, North Carolina. However, Pace decided to keep its base (also used for charter operations) in Winston-Salem.

In 2006 AirTran Airways discontinued its service to Atlanta; it was the fourth-largest airline serving Myrtle Beach International at the time.

Direct Air connected a number of airports to Myrtle Beach from 2007 until 2012, when it abruptly filed for Chapter 7 bankruptcy and ceased operations. The failure of Direct Air caused a slump in passenger traffic at Myrtle Beach, which declined 16% in 2012 but rebounded in 2013. WestJet began service to Toronto in summer 2013 with a revenue guarantee from Horry County, but its passenger numbers fell short of expectations, forcing the county to pay WestJet around $570,000.

The airport was a designated launch abort site for the Space Shuttle, but was never used.

On July 26, 2022, it was announced that Indianapolis-based Leadership In Flight Training (LIFT) Academy would start hosting flight training operations. Leadership In Flight Training (LIFT) Academy instructs aeronaut hopefuls on how to pass and exceed the expectations set by the Federal Aviation Administration (FAA) for commercial pilots, training up to 300 students each year. Negotiations are currently underway between LIFT, MYR, the City of Myrtle Beach about a suitable long-term facility for the flight training program. LIFT plans to begin operations in Myrtle Beach as early as October 2022, sending flight training students from its Indianapolis branch to Myrtle Beach.

Renovations
In 2008 two renovations took place in the terminal building. In July 2010, the FAA approved a $4.50 passenger facilities charge on all airline tickets to and from MYR in order to defray part of the cost for the terminal upgrade.

On March 16, 2021, it was reported that Myrtle Beach International Airport was working on a 20-year plan that would more than double the number of gates at the airport, however details remain to be worked out. There are currently two proposals for terminal expansions, which both would more than double the 11 gates the airport has now. One of the plans call for 23 gates, and the other calls for 25 and would be built on the east side of the airport. The plan has three possible layouts for new parking with one being a parking garage on the east side. One of the other major addition includes more international flights and there have been talks with two different international airlines. Another possible addition would be providing space for a major shipping distribution center like FedEx or Amazon. The 20-year plan has been finalized and may be presented before the Federal Aviation Administration by the end of 2021.

However, on March 18, 2021, it was airport officials clarified the airport's immediate future plans stating a presentation showing the expansion of terminals as well as parking lots was a long-term concept, but no expansions will be implemented in the near future. These documents show the early stages of a legally required 20-year master plan, that began in 2018 but was put on pause due to the pandemic.

On April 8, 2022, it was announced that the airport is planning on doing a $35 million expansion that will be primarily funded by the federal bipartisan infrastructure bill that was signed into law last year by President Joe Biden.  The renovations will include adding 4-5 new gates onto the end of the "A" gate that is located on the south side of the building, more fuel storage that will add 100,000 gallons in fuel storage capacity in case of future supply crunches, security checkpoint that will alleviate the pressure created by the current TSA bottleneck, and add more space for restaurants and retail.

Facilities
The airport covers 3,795 acres (1,536 ha) at an elevation of 25 feet (8 m). Its single runway, 18/36, is 9,503 long (2,897 x 46 m). The airport entrance is on Harrelson Boulevard.

The Terminal Building is named for Myrtle Beach's first mayor, Dr. Wilford Leroy Harrelson, who served from March 1938 to December 1939 and again from January 1942 to December 1943. The city bought land for the airport during his first term, and the terminal was named in his honor.

MYR has a helipad primarily used by charter tour companies at the base of runway 36.

In the year ending January 31, 2019 the airport had 125,925 aircraft operations, average 345 per day: 59% air taxi, 19% airline, 16% general aviation, and 6% military. 51 aircraft were then based at the airport: 38 single-engine, 6 multi-engine, 1 jet, and 6 helicopter.

The airport had an air cargo building at the entrance of the airport; the building closed a few years ago and is mainly used by airport maintenance for storage.

Airlines and destinations

Passenger

Cargo

Statistics

Top destinations

Airline market share

Annual traffic

Accidents and incidents
On July 23, 1950, a USAF Curtiss C-46 Commando crashed 1.9 miles west of Myrtle Beach AFB when the left aileron detached after takeoff and lost control at an altitude of about 1000–2000 feet. Both wings failed and the aircraft crashed. All four crew and 35 occupants were killed.

References

External links

 
 Myrtle Beach International (MYR) at the South Carolina Aeronautics Commission
 Myrtle Beach International Airport page at Yelp
 Myrtle Beach Airport Shutttle page at Transportation
 Map of the airport from OpenStreetMap
 
 

Airports in South Carolina
Buildings and structures in Myrtle Beach, South Carolina
Transportation in Horry County, South Carolina
Space Shuttle Emergency Landing Sites